Los Angeles Ballet (LAB) is a classical ballet company based in Los Angeles. While rehearsals take place at the Los Angeles Ballet Center, the company tours venues across LA County, such as the Dolby Theatre and Royce Hall, during its performances. LAB typically hosts two classical ballets each season, with an additional Balanchine performance in the spring. The company was founded and is co-directed by husband-and-wife team Thordal Christensen and Colleen Neary. The company debuted December 2006 with an original performance of The Nutcracker.

History 
The original Los Angeles Ballet was founded in 1974 under the direction of John Clifford a former principal dancer with New York City Ballet. Eleven years later, in 1985, financial difficulties forced Clifford's company to close.

Two decades later, in 2004, a new Los Angeles Ballet was established by Co-Artistic Directors Thordal Christensen and Colleen Neary. The company debuted in December 2006, with an original production of The Nutcracker, choreographed by Christensen and Neary, featuring costumes commissioned by Christensen the Royal Danish Ballet and a Southern California-themed set designed by Catherine Kanner. LAB continues to host performances of The Nutcracker annually. In 2009, LAB presented Bournonville's La Sylphide, its first full-length classical story ballet after The Nutcracker.  At the end of nine seasons it presented 28 productions encompassing 50 works, including 15 commissioned world premieres.

In addition to its repertoire of well-known classical ballets, Los Angeles Ballet has also commissioned 15 new works, one developed out of LAB's Choreographic Workshop, whose purpose of the workshop is to identify and nurture Southern Californian choreographic talent.

In 2017, Los Angeles Ballet Orchestra, under the direction of internationally renowned conductor Andrea Quinn debuted with The Nutcracker at the Dolby Theatre.

Artistic staff

Artistic directors
Thordal Christensen and his wife, Colleen Neary, are founding directors of the ballet. Christensen was a former principal dancer for and artistic director of the Royal Danish Ballet, with Neary appointed as the ‘first ballet mistress’ in charge of their productions. Neary was a principal dancer with Pacific Northwest Ballet and a Soloist with New York City Ballet under George Balanchine, and is currently a repetiteur for The George Balanchine Trust.

Lighting and design
Tyler Lambert Perkins operates as the company's lighting director for performances. Catherine Kanner manages design, promotion, and marketing for the company, handling art direction and sets each season.

Dancers 
The company commenced with 21 dancers, later the company has ranged from 21 to 37 dancers each year. LAB holds auditions in Seattle, LA, and New York City. If selected, company members are offered 25-week contracts.

Principals
 Petra Conti
 Tigran Sargsyan
 Kenta Shimizu
 Akimitsu Yahata

Soloists 
 Laura Chachich
 Magnus Christoffersen
 Jasmine Perry

Company

 McKenzie Byrne
 Cassidy Cocke
 Brigitte Edwards
 Lilly Fife
 Kate Inoue
 Hannah Keene
 Julianne Kinasiewicz 
 Tate Lee
 Cassidy McAndrew
 Leah McCall
 Madeline McMillin
 Mackenzie Moser
 Clay Murray
 Dave Naquin
 Santiago Paniagua
 Cesar Ramirez
 Marcos Ramirez
 Brittany Rand
 Joshua Schwartz 
 Linnea Swarting
 Ryo Araki

Former members

Former dancers
 Melissa Barak
Lana Condor
 Craig Hall
 Bianca Bulle
 Eris Nezha
 Chelsea Page Johnston
 Shintaro Akana
 Joshua Brown
 Abby Callahan
 Brittany Cavaco
 Alyssa Harrington 
 Jay Markov
 SarahAnne Perel
 Carolynn Rowland
 Cleo Taneja

Repertoire 
LAB's repertoire focuses on various works and styles; including Balanchine masterpieces staged by Neary, Bournonville ballets as imparted by Christensen, and classical ballets, such as including Giselle, Swan Lake, Don Quixote, Romeo and Juliet, and The Sleeping Beauty. As a répétiteur for The George Balanchine Trust, Neary is one of the rarified few charged with carrying on the Balanchine legacy.

School and programs 
The Ballet has an associated training academy, the Los Angeles Ballet School, serving pupils from beginner to pre-professional programs. Starting from the foundation of the LAB, it has developed multiple charity and arts programs. The “Power of Performance” program provides free tickets to disadvantaged children, seniors, veterans, and their families. The LAB also sponsors ‘A Chance to Dance Community Day’ event launched in October 2012. Being an all ages event, the public is encouraged to participate in free ballet, hip-hop, Yoga, Pilates and various other dance/fitness classes. The program intakes roughly 200 participants every year. The school runs a Choreographic Workshop, to identify Southern California choreographic talent.

Los Angeles Ballet Center 
Located on the Westside of Los Angeles, the LA Ballet Center encompasses the Los Angeles Ballet and the Los Angeles Ballet School. The center spans 12,000 square feet incorporating three studios.

References

External links 
 Los Angeles Ballet website

Ballet companies in the United States
2006 establishments in California
Culture of Los Angeles
Performing groups established in 2006
Dance in California